"The Moon Song" is a song from the 2013 feature film Her, with music composed by Karen Orzolek (Karen O) and lyrics by Orzolek and Spike Jonze. Performed by O during the film's end credits, the song was also performed by the film's main characters, Samantha (Scarlett Johansson) and Theodore (Joaquin Phoenix). A digital single containing all three versions of the song was released on February 11, 2014, by WaterTower Music.

In January 2014, the song was nominated for Best Original Song at the 86th Academy Awards, but lost to "Let It Go" from Frozen. O performed the song at the ceremony accompanied by Ezra Koenig on guitar on March 2, 2014. In December 2014, the song was nominated for Best Song Written for Visual Media at the 57th Grammy Awards, but once again lost to "Let It Go".

Track listing

Charts

References

2013 songs
Joaquin Phoenix songs
Scarlett Johansson songs
Songs written by Karen O
Songs written for films
WaterTower Music singles